Senator Herbst may refer to:

Della Herbst (born 1935), Wyoming State Senate
Marie Herbst (1928–2015), Connecticut State Senate